Zavrh is a settlement in the Municipality of Lenart in northeastern Slovenia. It lies in the Slovene Hills above the valley of the Pesnica River The area is part of the traditional region of Styria. It is now included in the Drava Statistical Region.

In a house in the village where the Slovene general Rudolf Maister occasionally stayed a memorial room was set up in 1986. There is also a 17 m high observation tower known as Maister's Observation Tower in the settlement. It is a metal structure erected in 1982 to replace an earlier wooden structure based on plans by Maister's son Borut from 1963.

References

External links

Zavrh on Geopedia

Populated places in the Municipality of Lenart